The Diocese of Caguas is a Latin Church ecclesiastical territory or diocese of the Catholic Church in the Caribbean, consisting of the southeastern portions of Puerto Rico in the United States.  The diocese is led by Bishop Eusebio Ramos Morales whose seat is the mother church in the City of Caguas, Catedral Dulce Nombre de Jesús (Cathedral of the Sweet Name of Jesus). The cathedral was built as a parish church in the 19th century.

The See of Caguas was canonically erected on November 4, 1964 and is a suffragan diocese in the ecclesiastical province of the metropolitan Archdiocese of San Juan de Puerto Rico, of which it was previously a part. Its jurisdiction includes the municipalities of Naranjito, Barranquitas, Comerío, Aguas Buenas, Caguas, Gurabo, Aibonito, Cidra, Cayey, San Lorenzo, Juncos, Las Piedras, Yabucoa, and Maunabo.

Bishops
Ordinaries
Rafael Grovas Felix (1965-1981 Retired)
Enrique Manuel Hernández Rivera (1981-1998 Resigned) 
Ruben González Medina, C.M.F. (2000–2016 Appointed, Bishop of Ponce)
Eusebio Ramos Morales (2017-current)

Auxiliary Bishops
 Antulio Parrilla Bonilla (1965-1968); resigned

San Juan Archdiocese bankruptcy
On 7 September 2018, Judge Edward Godoy ruled that the bankruptcy filed by the Archdiocese of San Juan would also apply to every Catholic diocese in Puerto Rico, including Caguas, and that all would now have their assets protected under Chapter 11.

See also

 Caguas, Puerto Rico
 Catholic Church by country
 Catholic Church in the United States
 Global organisation of the Catholic Church
 Ecclesiastical Province of San Juan de Puerto Rico
 List of Roman Catholic archdioceses (by country and continent)
 List of Roman Catholic dioceses (alphabetical) (including archdioceses)
 List of Roman Catholic dioceses (structured view) (including archdioceses)
 List of the Catholic dioceses of the United States

References

External links
 Diócesis de Caguas (Official Site in Spanish)
 Official Facebook page (in Spanish)
 Roman Catholic Diocese of Caguas GCatholic.org website

1964 establishments in Puerto Rico
Caguas
Roman Catholic dioceses in the United States
Christian organizations established in 1964
Caguas